A Commission Sharing Agreement (CSA), or in the US named Client Commission Agreement (CCA), is a type of soft dollar arrangement that allows money managers to separately pay the executing broker for trade execution and ask that broker to allocate a portion of the commission directly to an independent research provider. CSAs consist of a percentage of execution fees, that are directed to pay for research reports from sell-side banks. The form of a CSA can be as short as one page. One of the disadvantages of CSAs is the counterparty risk, that the broker becomes as the cash is held on the broker's balance sheet  and not in a segregated client account. Moves included in MiFID II such as the creation of Research Payment Accounts (RPAs) aim to address this issue.

References 

Financial services